The Writers' & Artists' Yearbook is an annual directory for writers and illustrators which offers creative and practical advice on how to give your work the best chance at success. It is published in the UK each July, alongside the Children's Writers' & Artists' Yearbook. The Yearbook contains 100 articles covering every aspect of the publishing world and the paths which creatives can follow to gain entry into it, and over 4,500 named industry contacts including agents, publishers, media companies and societies.

In 2007, an associated website, www.writersandartists.co.uk, was launched which now includes additional articles, interviews and resources as well as a community forum to connect users. The brand also runs events and masterclasses and offers a series of editorial services including manuscript reviews and edits, consultations and mentoring.

As well as the annual Yearbooks, Writers & Artists also publish a series of companion guides which dive deeper into specific areas of publishing. There most recent titles include Guide to Getting Published, Guide to Self-Publishing, Guide to How to Hook an Agent, Guide to Writing for Children and YA, Guide to How to Write, The Organised Writer and The Right Word. Writers on Writing will be published September 2021.

History 

First published in 1906, by Adam & Charles Black, the original Writers’ & Artists’ Yearbook was an 80-page booklet, costing one shilling. It gave details of seven literary agents and 89 publishers. Articles offering advice first appeared in the 1914 yearbook. It has been published on an annual basis since, expanding over time to include information for illustrators, and to adapt to the changing digital landscape of the publishing industry and the rise of self-publishing. A&C Black became part of Bloomsbury Publishing in 2000 and Bloomsbury now publishes the entire collection of Writers & Artists titles and companion guides.

In 2004, Bloomsbury launched the Children's Writers' and Artists' Yearbook that includes articles and advice specifically focused on the children's book market. It contains articles from a diverse array of successful children's authors across different genres, mediums and age ranges, as well as contact details tailored to the children's publishing industry.

In 2007, Writers & Artists launched an associated website. Initially this was only accessible to anyone purchasing the print edition. In 2009, the website was relaunched and now includes freely available blogs, articles, interviews and a community platform, as well as paid for content which is additional to what can be found in the Yearbook. From 2013, the website featured a section dedicated to self-publishing. The website was relaunched in 2021.

In 2013 Writers & Artists began publishing companion guides alongside the annual Yearbooks focusing on specific areas of writing and publishing.

The Yearbook is now in its 114th year and remains the number one bestselling guide for aspiring writers and illustrators.

Sections and listings 

The yearbook is divided into the following sections:
 Newspapers and magazines – writing and pitching; regional, national and overseas, syndicates and news agencies
 Books – the publishing process, inspiring writers and writing advice; regional, national and overseas publishers, audio publishers, book packagers and book clubs
 Poetry – publication and performance; publishers and societies 
 Screen and audio – film, television, audiobooks and podcasts; production companies
 Theatre – publication, adaptation, reviews and performance; production companies 
 Literary agents – purpose, choice and submission; UK, Ireland and overseas agents 
 Art and illustration – illustration and photography, portfolios and freelancing; agents, commercial studios and card and stationery publishers 
 Societies, prizes and festivals – associations and clubs, prizes and awards and literary festivals
 Self-publishing – pathways, publication and hybrids; book sites, blogs, podcasts, services and providers
 Resources for writers – editing, blogging, indexing, software and glossaries; courses, libraries and writers' retreats
 Copyright and libel information – copyright and licensing
 Finance for writers and artists – earnings, income tax and national insurance.

Children's Writers' & Artists' Yearbook 
 
The Children's Writers' & Artists' Yearbook follows the same structure and includes the same type of information as the original yearbook but is specific to the children's publishing industry. The term "children's"incorporates everything from baby board books to young adult fiction. Advice unique to the children's edition includes topics such as the business of picture books, writing to read aloud, how to deal with difficult topics, creating diverse stories, what is 'age appropriate', reinventing classic stories, series fiction and pseudonyms, compelling non-fiction, creating comics and graphic novels, writing for reluctant readers and visiting schools.

The current edition of the Children's Yearbook is the 2022 edition. Highlights include insights and advice from Michael Morpurgo, Sarah Crossan, Jacqueline Wilson, Lauren St John, Kiran Millwood Hargrave, Sophie McKenzie, Holly Bourne, Liz Pichon and Quentin Blake, as well as a range of publishing professionals and experts.

Other Writers' & Artists' titles 

 The Writers' & Artists' Guide to Getting Published by Alysoun Owen
 The Writers' & Artists Guide to Writing for Children and YA by Linda Strachan
 The Writers' & Artists Guide to How to Hook an Agent by James Rennoldson
 The Writers' & Artists' Guide to Self-Publishing
 The Writers' & Artists Guide to How to Write by William Ryan
 The Organised Writer by Antony Johnston
 The Right Word: A Writer's Toolkit of Grammar, Vocabulary and Literary Terms
Writers on Writing: A Book of Quotations

Writers & Artists website 
The Writers & Artists website brings together information and advice for aspiring writers alongside additional services and a community hub. Blog posts include interviews with writers, guest posts from industry professionals, top tips and reading lists which include books, videos and podcasts. The self-publishing page is an offshoot of the main website dedicated entirely to presenting users with all of the available self-publishing options and guiding them along the various pathways. The community hub allows users to create a profile, post questions and answers, and share their work for feedback and give feedback to others. Users earn points for their activity which can be converted into rewards including a free book, free attendance at a Bloomsbury event and discounts for Writers and Artists events. Through the website users can also sign up for events and masterclasses, and access editorial services including manuscript reviews and mentoring.

Other Writers & Artists services

Events and courses 
Events are hosted by industry professionals, include masterclasses, courses and literary lunches with agents from across the UK, and span an afternoon, evening or entire day. Topics range from the broad, such as submitting a manuscript and advanced fiction writing to the more specific, such as writing villains or historical fiction.

Editorial services 
Writers & Artists offer four stages of editorial review: the opportunity to submit your questions to a literary agent, a full review and edit of your manuscript,  a masterclass on how to submit your manuscript and a clinic appointment with a literary agent to boost your chances of success. All advisors involved are experienced professionals with long and diverse careers.

Competitions 
Writers & Artists run regular competitions where prizes range from free books to places on writing retreats. Their annual Short Story Competition invites entrants to submit a short story of no more than 2,000 words and offers a place on an Arvon residential writing retreat to the winner.

See also 

Arvon Foundation

References

External links 
Writers&Artists website



Directories
1906 establishments in the United Kingdom
Handbooks and manuals
Yearbooks
Publishing
A & C Black books